Dance's sign is an eponymous medical sign consisting of an investigation of the right lower quadrant of the abdomen for retraction, which can be an indication of intussusception, i.e. those with intussusception may have retraction of the right iliac fossa.

Eponym
It was originally described by the French pathologist Jean Baptiste Hippolyte Dance (1797–1832).

References

External links
 Biology Online
 PatientPlus

Medical signs